Rudawy Landscape Park (Rudawski Park Krajobrazowy) is a protected area (Landscape Park) in south-western Poland, established in 1989.

The Park lies within Lower Silesian Voivodeship.

External links 

Rudawy
Parks in Lower Silesian Voivodeship